Brenda Doreen Mignon de Banzie (28 July 1909 – 5 March 1981) was a British actress of stage and screen (some sources mistakenly quote 1915 as her year of birth).

Biography

De Banzie was the daughter of Edward Thomas de Banzie, conductor and musical director, and his second wife Dorothy (née Lancaster), whom he married in 1908. In 1911, the family lived in Salford, Lancashire.

She appeared as Maggie Hobson in the David Lean film version of Hobson's Choice (1954) with John Mills and Charles Laughton, set in Salford. Laughton allegedly didn't like de Banzie, because she wasn't getting 'her part right'. De Banzie also upstaged Laughton who was, by all accounts, a notorious upstager himself.

Her most notable film role was as Phoebe Rice, the hapless wife of comedian Archie Rice (played by Laurence Olivier) in the 1960 film version of John Osborne's The Entertainer. She had also appeared on Broadway in the original play, for which she received a Tony Award nomination.

Other memorable film roles included The Man Who Knew Too Much (1956) directed by Alfred Hitchcock, Too Many Crooks (1959) and The Pink Panther (1963) directed by Blake Edwards.

De Banzie died at the age of 71 due to complications following brain surgery. She was the aunt of actress Lois de Banzie.

Selected filmography

 The Long Dark Hall (1951) – Mrs. Rogers
 I Believe in You (1952) – Mrs. Hooker
 Private Information (1952) – Dolly
 Never Look Back (1952) – Molly Wheeler
 The Yellow Balloon (1953) – Fruit Stall Customer (uncredited)
 A Day to Remember (1953) – Mrs. Collins
 Don't Blame the Stork (1954) – Evelyn Steele
 Hobson's Choice (1954) – Maggie Hobson
 What Every Woman Wants (1954) – Sarah
 The Purple Plain (1954) – Miss McNab
 The Happiness of Three Women (1954) – Jane Price
 As Long as They're Happy (1955) – Stella Bentley
 A Kid for Two Farthings (1955) – 'Lady' Ruby
 Doctor at Sea (1955) – Muriel Mallet
 The Man Who Knew Too Much (1956) – Lucy Drayton
 House of Secrets (1956) – Mme. Isabella Ballu
 Passport to Shame (1958) – Aggie
 Too Many Crooks (1959) – Lucy
 The 39 Steps (1959) – Nellie Lumsden
 The Entertainer (1960) – Phoebe Rice
 The Mark (1961) – Gertrude Cartwright
 Flame in the Streets (1961) – Nell Palmer
 Come September (1961) – Margaret Allison
 A Pair of Briefs (1962) – Gladys Worthing
 I Thank a Fool (1962) – Nurse Drew
 The Pink Panther (1963) – Angela Dunning
 Pretty Polly (1967) – Mrs. Innes-Hook

References

External links

 
 
 

1909 births
1981 deaths
20th-century English actresses
Actresses from Salford
Actresses from Manchester
English film actresses
English stage actresses